Enmax Corporation (often styled as ENMAX) is a vertically integrated utility that generates and distributes electricity, natural gas, renewable energy, and value-added services to customers in Alberta, Canada.

Overview
Enmax, headquartered in Calgary, Alberta, Canada, is a wholly owned subsidiary of The City of Calgary.

According to their 2013 annual report, in 2013, Enmax generated net earnings of $352.5 million and paid a dividend to The City of Calgary in the amount of $67.5 million (Enmax 2013:8). Enmax’s core operations include electricity generation, transmission and distribution and the sale of electricity natural gas and renewable energy products to residential, commercial and institutional customers in Alberta.

History
In 1904, The City of Calgary built its own electric plant when its contract with a private supplier ended. The City of Calgary Electric System began operating on December 2, 1905. In 1996, City Council approved a proposal to make The City of Calgary Electric System a wholly owned subsidiary Enmax Corporation commencing on January 1, 1998. This subsidiary and an affiliated retailer, "Enmax Energy", was incorporated on January 1, 1998. January 1, 2001, Enmax Energy entered the restructured, deregulated electric marketplace in Alberta.

Enmax Power regulated and non-regulated operations

Enmax Power Corporation (EPC), the Transmission and Distribution services business line, is made up of regulated and non-regulated operations. This entity is responsible for the operation and maintenance of the City of Calgary’s distribution system and a portion of the transmission network, ensuring ongoing reliability of the electricity supply to Calgarians. (Enmax 2011:20).

Enmax Power’s regulated operations include the provision of electricity transmission, distribution and management services for the regulated rate option to customers in the Calgary area. Covering 1,089 square kilometres in Calgary and surrounding areas, Enmax Power’s transmission system consists of approximately 300 km of transmission wires and 7,600 km of distribution lines in Calgary and surrounding areas, with 37 substations powering residences and businesses within Calgary city limits. (Enmax 2011:3).

In 2011, Enmax Power worked on several projects such as the Downtown Cable Replacement Project, North Calgary Area Transmission Project and the South Calgary Reinforcement Project to meet the increasing need for electricity spurred by Calgary’s rapid growth. (Enmax 2011:26).

Enmax Energy Corporation

Enmax Energy Corporation (EEC) is the generation and energy retail services arm of Enmax that offers electricity and natural gas products and services to customers. Enmax Energy’s electricity is supplied through a combination of long-term contracts, namely power purchase agreements (PPAs), ownership of generation facilities, and purchases from the Alberta electricity market. Natural gas is supplied by purchases in Alberta's natural gas market. Current operating facilities include the Crossfield Energy Centre, Calgary Energy Centre, and the Downtown District Energy Centre. Enmax Energy’s owned generation also includes 100 per cent ownership of the 80 MW Taber wind farm and 63 MW Kettles Hill wind farm, and a 50 per cent interest in the 75 MW McBride Lake wind farm, all located in southern Alberta. The company continues to receive significant supply from its power purchase agreements (PPAs) with the Keephills and Battle River coal-fired facilities. (Enmax 2011:19). The company is in the initial building phase of the Shepard Energy Centre, an 800 megawatt (MW) combined-cycle facility and has received regulatory approval for the Bonnybrook Energy Centre, a 165 MW cogeneration facility. (Enmax 2011:19).

Additional Enmax subsidiaries

Enmax Energy Corporation not only works within the Wholesale Energy and Generation business lines but also provides energy products to Alberta customers. Enmax Energy provides the EasyMax option for residential and small business customers. EasyMax is an electricity and gas energy plan for residential and small business customers providing competitive rate options with no penalty for cancellation. Additionally, specialized billing and data management solutions to industrial customers, primarily in the oil and gas sector, are offered through the Enmax subsidiary, Enmax Commercial Services Inc. (formerly Valeo Power Corporation).

Enmax Power Services Corporation (EPSC), a subsidiary of Enmax Corporation, provides engineering, procurement, construction, and maintenance services for overhead, underground, and light rail transit (LRT) utility infrastructure, roadway lighting, and signal and communication systems. EPSC is not regulated by the Alberta Utilities Commission. In September 2010, Fort Chicago Energy Partners L.P(now Veresen Inc) agreed to purchase the British Columbia-based hydro assets of EPSC. These include Furry Creek Hydro, upper and lower Clowhom Hydro, and 50 percent interest in Culliton Creek Hydro.

Enmax Encompass Inc., a subsidiary of Enmax Corporation, provides billing and customer care services to residential and small commercial customers. Enmax Encompass is also contracted to perform customer service, water meter reading and billing services to The City of Calgary and other municipalities across the province.

Enmax Envision Inc., a subsidiary of Enmax Corporation, provides commercial high-speed data and internet services primarily in Calgary. Enmax Envision grew its customer base by 23 per cent and its revenue by 12 per cent in 2011. (Enmax 2011:).

Enmax sold its Envision subsidiary to Shaw Communications Inc. in April 2013 for $225 Million.

District Energy Centre

The Calgary District Energy Centre began operations in March 2010, capable of providing heat for up to 10 million square feet of buildings. The facility incorporates high efficiency boilers fueled by natural gas. District Energy is more efficient, has fewer emissions and is more cost-effective than conventional heating systems.  Customers are connected to the facility through an underground thermal distribution system, which occupies significantly less space than a traditional heating system.

Shepard Energy Centre

The Shepard Energy Centre is a natural gas-fuelled power plant located in Calgary, Alberta. It is Alberta's largest natural gas-fuelled power facility, being capable of generating more than 800 megawatts of power to Alberta's provincial grid. The Shepard Energy Centre is also one of the most efficient gas plants in Alberta. The Shepard Energy Centre will also emit less than half the carbon dioxide per MW of conventional natural gas-fuelled energy plants.

Price of electricity fluctuates widely in Calgary

By April 2014 it was announced that electricity prices for homeowners and industry in Calgary will spike nearly 40 per cent from "seven cents per kilowatt-hour in April likely to 10.6 cents in May. According to the Calgary Herald in Calgary the price of electricity is based on a "wildly fluctuating monthly price." Edmonton customers already pay 50 percent less in access fees than Calgary consumers because in Edmonton, the price of electricity is a flat rate based on consumption. As well "the local access fee charged to Enmax customers on behalf of the city will also increase."

The Regulated Rate Option (RRO)
The RRO is the default option if households and small businesses in Calgary do not choose an energy plan with a retail supplier. Prior to 2006 the price of electricity with the RRO would fluctuate quarterly or yearly. In July 2006 the Province of Alberta introduced new provincial regulations that meant that the Regulated Rate Option (RRO) for Calgary would fluctuate monthly.

Bonnybrook Energy Centre

The Bonnybrook Energy Centre is a planned natural gas-fired cogeneration facility that will be built in Calgary’s southeast industrial zone. Once built, Bonnybrook will generate 165 MW of electricity, which is approximately half of downtown Calgary’s energy requirements (Enmax 2011:24). This facility will reduce the amount of fresh water used by reusing industrial wastewater from the nearby Canada malting site and will play an integral role in heating office buildings in downtown Calgary. Bonnybrook will emit less than half of the carbon dioxide associated with conventional coal-fired facilities and will enhance the reliability of the region’s power supply (Enmax 2011:21).

Generate Choice

In 2011, Enmax Energy launched its Generate Choice, a program which offers Albertans home-based renewable energy choices such as solar power and wind generation (Enmax 2011:7). Response to the program has been poor: by August 2011, only 3,100 people even expressed interest in having a solar photo-voltaic (PV) system installed, and of those, only 172 agreed to have one installed.

In June 2012, Brian Keating, one of Calgary’s best-known naturalists and an official spokesperson for Generate Choice, became the 100th Calgary homeowner to join in the program. "Through a lease program, the panels generate a portion of a home’s energy needs. A set of six panels is a 1.3 kilowatt-hour photovoltaic system that will produce between 1,000 and 1,400 kWh per year. The average home in Calgary uses 625 kWh per month," says Colin Dumais, technology specialist with Enmax".

Financial performance

Enmax is a wholly owned subsidiary of The City of Calgary. Over the last 11 years, Enmax has returned approximately $600 million to The City of Calgary. In 2011, over $550 million was invested back into Calgary’s electricity infrastructure to maintain reliability and support future growth. Revenues increased from $2.4 billion in 2010 to $3.1 billion in 2011. In 2011, the company generated net earnings of $184.6 million and paid a dividend in the amount of $56 million to its Shareholder, The City of Calgary (Enmax 2019:8).

Public involvement
Enmax has been named one of Alberta’s Top 50 employers by Mediacorp.

Controversy

In 2011, the CEO of Enmax, Gary Holden, resigned after controversial handling of travel expenses that violated the company's ethical guidelines.

See also
List of Canadian electric utilities
Enmax Centre
Enmax Centrium
Electricity policy of Alberta

Enmax publications cited

 Enmax-2013-Annual-Review

References

External links
 Energy Rates in Alberta
 Enmax Company Website

Companies based in Calgary
Energy companies of Canada
Companies owned by municipalities of Canada
1905 establishments in Alberta
Electric power companies of Canada